Below is a list of Russian language exonyms for places, mainly in Europe. Note that this list only includes names that are significantly different from the local toponym, some exonyms are marked as historical, modern exonyms may match the toponyms.

Albania

Austria

Azerbaijan

Belgium

China

Cuba

Cyprus

Czech Republic

Denmark

Egypt

Estonia

France

Germany

Greece

Iran

Israel

Italy

Latvia

Lithuania

Libya

Mali

Moldova

Mongolia

Morocco

Netherlands

North Korea

Palestine

Poland

Portugal

Romania

Serbia

South Korea

Sweden

Switzerland

Syria

Thailand

Turkey

Turkmenistan

Ukraine

United Kingdom

United States

See also 
List of European exonyms
Names of Belarusian places in other languages
Names of Lithuanian places in other languages

Exonym
Transliteration
Lists of exonyms
Exonym